Edel is both a surname and a given name. Notable people with the name include:

Surname:
 Abraham Edel (1908–2007), North American philosopher and ethicist
 Alfred William Edel (c. 1930–2005), American television news presenter
 Apoula Edel (born 1986), Cameroonian-Armenian footballer
 Leon Edel (1907–1997), North American literary critic and biographer
 Uli Edel (born 1947), German film director

Given name:
 Edel Plareza, Irish historian and academic
 Edel Oliva (born 1965), Cuban race walker
 Edel Rodriguez (born 1971), Cuban-American artist and illustrator
 Edel Quinn (1907–1944), Irish lay missionary
 Edel Randem (1910–2001), Norwegian figure skater
 Edel Therese Høiseth (born 1966), former speed skater from Norway, who specialised in the shorter distances; the 500 m and 1,000 m
 Edel Eckblad (1914–1994), Norwegian actress
 Edele Jernskjæg (died 1512), Danish noble, lady-in-waiting and royal mistress of King John I of Denmark

Other uses
 Construction Nautic Edel, a French boat builder
 Edel 665, a French sailboat design
 Edel SE & Co. KGaA, a German independent media company
 , a French cheese from 
 Edel Land District, a land district (cadastral division) of Western Australia, located within the North-West Land Division
 Edel-Mega Records, a Danish record company established in 1983. It was renamed Edel-Mega Records when it was acquired by Edel Music in 2001
 Langenlonsheim Airfield (ICAO code EDEL)
 Edel Paragliders, a defunct South Korean paraglider manufacturing company
 Edelmann, a surname of German origin
 Edelstein, a surname of German origin
 Edel, another name for the logic puzzle nonogram